Henri-Paul Deyvaux-Gassier (1883–1951) was a French caricaturist and illustrator.

1883 births
1951 deaths
French Communist Party members
French Section of the Workers' International politicians
French caricaturists
French illustrators